Regine Kahmann (born 20 October 1948 in Staßfurt, Saxony-Anhalt) is a German microbiologist and was Director at the Max Planck Institute for Terrestrial Microbiology in Marburg from 2000 to 2019. She was made a Foreign Member of the Royal Society (ForMRS) in 2020.

Kahmann's early work focused on microbiology and phages. She later switched to studying corn smut (Ustilago maydis), and the causes of disease in maize. Corn smut is now considered a model organism for the study of biotrophic fungi.

Early life 
Regine Kahmann was born in Staßfurt, Saxony-Anhalt in 1948 to Werner and Elfriede Kahmann. Her parents were farmers in Langenweddingen, near Magdeburg in East Germany. Due to land reform and political repression, her family left the German Democratic Republic in 1952, settling in Rassau, near Uelzen in Lower Saxony.

Career 
After graduating from the Lessing School in Uelzen in 1967, Kahmann studied biology at the University of Göttingen with a focus on microbiology until 1972.  Following her doctorate from 1972 to 1974 at the Max Planck Institute for Molecular Genetics and the Free University of Berlin with the theme The structure of SPP1 DNA after transfection of B. subtilis.  As a postdoctoral fellow, she went to Cold Spring Harbor Laboratory in the US, where she became in 1976 Junior Group Leader. From 1980 to 1982 she worked as a research assistant at the Max Planck Institute for Biochemistry in Martinsried. In 1982 she started an independent research group at the Max Planck Institute for Molecular Genetics in Berlin followed by appointments at the Institute of Gene-Biological Research in Berlin (1987), and professor of genetics at the Institute for Genetics and Microbiology at the Ludwig Maximilians University (1992).  In January 2000, Kahmann became a scientific member of the Max Planck Society and director at the Max Planck Institute for Terrestrial Microbiology in Marburg, and in April 2001 also a professor of genetics at the Philipps University in Marburg. In 2019, she became the acting head of the Department of Organismic Interactions at the Max Planck Institute in Marburg.

Research 
Kahmann works in the field of the molecular phytopathology- the molecular basis of plant diseases.  She examines, among other things, how microbes and viruses infect cells and which genes influence these attacks.  "In her work on phage mu – a virus that affects a whole range of bacterial species – Regine Kahmann was able to show, among other things, that the decision as to which host can be infected is regulated by inversion of a certain section of DNA. The inversion is done by site-specific recombination. Regine Kahmann was able to show that this process is stimulated by the bacterial host's FIS protein in addition to the actual recombinase. The elucidation of the stimulation mechanism is internationally considered a scientific masterpiece."

A major research focus in her lab is the investigation of the infection mechanism of a parasitic fungus, corn smut (Ustilago maydis), which causes tumors on maize plants.

Academy memberships 

 1991 European Molecular Biology Organization
 1999 Bavarian Academy of Sciences (since 2001 as corresponding member) 
 1998 Academia Europaea
 2001 Berlin-Brandenburg Academy of Sciences
 2008 German Academy of Sciences Leopoldina
 2010 Academia Net
 2020 Royal Society (foreign member)

Prizes and awards 

 1993 Leibniz Prize of the German Research Foundation
 1997 Dannie Heineman Prize of the Göttingen Academy of Sciences
 1998 Order of Merit of the Federal Republic of Germany 
 1999 Bavarian Maximilian Order for Science and Art
 2011 Gregor Mendel Medal of the Leopoldina 
 2011 TUM Distinguished Affiliated Professor (honorary professor) of the Technical University of Munich

Selected work

References

External links

1948 births
Living people
German microbiologists
German women biologists
20th-century German biologists
21st-century German scientists
University of Göttingen alumni
Free University of Berlin alumni
Academic staff of the Ludwig Maximilian University of Munich
Academic staff of the University of Marburg
Foreign Members of the Royal Society
Foreign associates of the National Academy of Sciences
Members of the German Academy of Sciences Leopoldina
20th-century German women
21st-century German women
Max Planck Institute directors